Finland was represented by Lasse Mårtenson, with the song "Laiskotellen", at the 1964 Eurovision Song Contest, which took place on 21 March in Copenhagen. "Laiskotellen" was chosen as the Finnish entry at the national final organised by broadcaster Yle and held on 15 February.

Before Eurovision

National final
The final was held at the Yle studios in Helsinki, hosted by Aarno Walli. Six songs took part, with the winner being chosen by voting from ten regional juries and an "expert" jury.

At Eurovision 
On the night of the final Mårtenson performed 5th in the running order, following Denmark and preceding Austria. Only an audio recording of Mårtenson's performance is known to survive as the video master of the 1964 contest is believed to have been destroyed in a fire at the Danish TV archive in the 1970s. Voting was by each national jury awarding 5-3-1 to their top three songs, and at the close "Laiskotellen" had received 9 points (3 each from Denmark, Norway and the United Kingdom), placing Finland 7th of the 16 entries. The Finnish jury awarded its 5 points to contest winners Italy.

Voting

References 

1964
Countries in the Eurovision Song Contest 1964
Eurovision